Marc-André Leclerc (October 10, 1992 – March 5, 2018) was a Canadian rock climber and alpinist. Known for his solo ascents of numerous mountains in several parts of the world, he completed the first winter solo ascents of the Torre Egger in Patagonia and the Emperor Face of Mount Robson.

In 2021, a documentary called The Alpinist was released about Leclerc's life and climbs.

Early life 
Marc-André Leclerc was born on October 10, 1992, in Nanaimo, British Columbia, to Michelle Kuipers and Serge Leclerc. When Marc was eight years old, he was introduced to climbing when his grandfather bought him Chris Bonington's book, Quest for Adventure. At age nine, Marc had his first climbing experience in Coquitlam, on an indoor climbing wall inside a shopping mall. Later that year, he joined a gym in Abbotsford called Project Climbing. In 2005 his family moved to Agassiz, near the Cascade Range peaks, and Leclerc began teaching himself how to mountain climb. Leclerc would ride his bike out to Harrison Bluffs, a rock climbing area in British Columbia, to climb and spend the night there alone. When he was 15 years old, his mother bought him a copy of Mountaineering: The Freedom of the Hills. The book inspired him to join the British Columbia Mountaineering Club, through which he quickly made a name for himself in the mountaineering community. He started competing and quickly began winning age-group competitions and later went on to win the Canadian Nationals in 2005.

Climbing career 

In 2015, Leclerc spent a lot of time in southern Argentine Patagonia. On February 21, he completed his first solo ascent of The Corkscrew (5.10d A1) on Cerro Torre. Leclerc wrote on his blog that soloing The Corkscrew "felt like a brief 'step into the future' so to speak…" in his efforts to fulfill his lifelong dream of becoming an explorer. Argentinian climber and mountain guide Rolando Garibotti wrote that Leclerc's ascent of The Corkscrew was one of "earth-shifting proportions, by far the hardest route ever soloed on Cerro Torre and only the seventh solo overall." Later that year, Leclerc completed the second known free solo ascent of the Tomahawk / Exocet Link Up on Aguja Standhardt in Patagonia and then proceeded to climb the Torre Egger, completing his Torres solo trifecta.

In 2016, Leclerc completed the first solo ascent of the Infinite Patience route on Mt. Robson's Emperor Face. After completing this climb, he wrote on his blog that he "was intimidated by (the Emperor's) strong aura, but in the end, we became friends, and the King generously shared his wealth, leaving me a much richer person indeed."

Death 

On March 5, 2018, Marc-André Leclerc and his climbing partner, Ryan Johnson, reached the narrow summit via a new route on the North Face of the Mendenhall Towers (North of Juneau, Alaska). The duo were expected to make it back to base camp by March 7 but never arrived, prompting Juneau Mountain Rescue to search for the missing climbers. The search was delayed for four days due to poor weather conditions, and when the storm had finally passed, the search team discovered ropes at the bottom of the climbers' descent route. This suggests that the climbers were struck by an avalanche, falling rock, or cornice from above. Their bodies were never recovered.

Personal life 
Leclerc had one older sister, Bridgid-Anne Dunning, and a younger sibling, Kellyn Kavanagh. He was raised in the Fraser Valley of British Columbia, Canada, and resided in Squamish with his girlfriend Brette Harrington, also a rock climber, and alpinist. The pair met in Squamish in 2012, and in 2016, they established Hidden Dragon (5.12b) on the Chinese Puzzle Wall across from Mount Slesse.

Notable ascents
 2013 − The Temptation of St Anthony, Squamish, First Free Ascent (5.13a)
 2014 − Mount Slesse, Cascade Range – Triple Link-up of East Pillar Direct (5.10+), Navigator Wall (5.10+), Northeast Buttress (5.9+), Free Solo in 12 hours, 4 minutes
 2015 − Reverse Torre Traverse, Patagonia – First Ascent (5.10a)
 2015 − Directa de la Mentira – Cerro Torre North Face, Patagonia, First Ascent (5.10)
 2015 − The Corkscrew – Cerro Torre, Patagonia, First Solo Ascent (5.10d)
 2015 − Tomahawk/Exocet Link Up – Aguja Standhardt, Patagonia, – Onsight Free Solo (5.8)
 2015 − Free Ascent of the Muir Wall on El Capitan (5.13c)
 2016 − Mount Tuzo, Canadian Rockies – Northeast Face (M7+ WI6+R, 1,110 meters). First Ascent of the face
 2016 − Mount Robson, Canadian Rockies – Infinite Patience (VI 5.9 M5 WI5, 2200m). First Solo Ascent
 2016 − East Pillar – Torre Egger, Patagonia, First Solo Winter Ascent (5.10b)
 2017 − Ha Ling Peak, Mount Lawrence Grassi − Cheesmond Express (5.10), Premature Ejaculation (5.10+), Northeast Face (5.7) Free Solos
 2017 − Rim Wall, Canadian Rockies − Pinko (5.10). First Free Solo Ascent
 2017 − Echo Canyon, Canadian Rockies  − Tall Storey (5.11c) First Free Solo Ascent
 2018 − Mount Slesse, Cascade Range – Northeast Buttress, Free Solo in winter, 2nd Winter Ascent, First Winter Free Ascent (5.9+)
 2018 − The Theft, British Columbia, Canada. (M7 WI6+) Second Ascent
 2018 − Jupiter Shift on Station-D in the Slesse Cirque
 2018 − North face of the Main Tower, Mendenhall Towers. First Ascent

See also
Alex Honnold, American free soloist climber

References

External links 
 The Alpinist, a 2020 documentary about Marc-André Leclerc
 

1992 births
2018 deaths
Canadian mountain climbers
Canadian rock climbers
Franco-Columbian people
Mountaineering deaths
Sports deaths in Alaska
Sportspeople from Nanaimo
Free soloists
Ice climbers